Patrignone may refer to:

Patrignone, Arezzo, a village in the province of Arezzo, Italy
Patrignone, Montalto delle Marche, a village in the province of Ascoli Piceno, Italy
Patrignone, San Giuliano Terme, a village in the province of Pisa, Italy